Daniel Alberto Tílger  (born August 3, 1970) is an Argentine retired football striker who spent most of his career playing in the Colombian league.

Club career
Tílger has an extensive career in football. He began professionally at giant Boca Juniors in 1989, but his chances to play were few. In 1991, he moved to Colombia, where he spent the next eight years playing for several first division clubs including Deportes Quindío, Independiente Santa Fe, Deportivo Cali, Millonarios and América de Cali among others. In the Colombian league he built up his reputation as a charismatic and controversial players that got in trouble more than once. However, on the field he proved to be a lethal striker that scored over 100 goals in league play.

In 1999, he returned to Argentina and signed for Unión de Santa Fe. In 2002, he transferred to Argentinos Juniors, before joining Nueva Chicago where he play until 2004. After his spell at Mataderos, he was hired by Lanús. As a granate Tílger played until June 2005, and subsequently signed for Tiro Federal where he finished his era in the Argentine Primera División in 2006. The following year, he continued playing in the regionalised third tier, the Primera B Metropolitana with El Porvenir. In 2008 Tílger went across the Río de la Plata and joined Uruguayan second division club Durazno FC. He retired from the sport at age 42 while playing for Atlético Policial in the Argentine fourth division.

1999 Incident
In November 1999, while playing for Millonarios in the semi-finals of Copa Mustang against his former team Once Caldas, Tílger got involved in a scandal of large proportions. When he scored on Once Caldas goalie Juan Carlos Henao, Tílger approached Henao with a ridicule dance move trying to provoke him, Henao pushed him back and Tílger dropped to the floor faking an act of aggression by the Colombian goalkeeper. Since the referee didn't intervene at that point, he stood up and abruptly squeezed Henao's genitals. After the shameful incident was witnessed by the line-man, Tílger was sent off the field, and in addition he received a nine-game suspension by the league.

References

External links
 Argentine Primera statistics  
 BDFA profile 

1970 births
Living people
Sportspeople from Buenos Aires Province
Association football forwards
Argentine footballers
Boca Juniors footballers
Once Caldas footballers
América de Cali footballers
Atlético Junior footballers
Deportes Quindío footballers
Deportivo Cali footballers
Millonarios F.C. players
Unión de Santa Fe footballers
Nueva Chicago footballers
Argentinos Juniors footballers
Club Atlético Lanús footballers
Tiro Federal footballers
El Porvenir footballers
Argentine Primera División players
Categoría Primera A players
Expatriate footballers in Uruguay
Expatriate footballers in Colombia
Argentine expatriate footballers
Argentine expatriate sportspeople in Uruguay
Argentine expatriate sportspeople in Colombia